The 2014–15 WKU Lady Toppers basketball team represents Western Kentucky University during the 2014–15 NCAA Division I women's basketball season. The Lady Toppers were led by second year head coach Michelle Clark-Heard. They play their home games at E. A. Diddle Arena and were first year members of Conference USA. They finished the season 30–5, 16–2 in C-USA play to win the Conference USA regular season and also won the Conference USA Tournament. They received an automatic bid to the NCAA women's basketball tournament where they were defeated by Texas in the first round.

Roster

Schedule

|-
!colspan=9 style="background:#F5002F; color:#FFFFFF;"| Exhibition
 
|-
!colspan=9 style="background:#F5002F; color:#FFFFFF;"| Regular season

|-
!colspan=9 style="background:#F5002F; color:#FFFFFF;"| C-USA Tournament

|-
!colspan=9 style="background:#F5002F; color:#FFFFFF;"|NCAA Women's Tournament

Rankings

See also
2014–15 WKU Hilltoppers basketball team

References

Western Kentucky Lady Toppers basketball seasons
WKU
Wku
Western Kentucky
Western Kentucky